Essair (short for Efficiency, Safety, and Speed in the Air) was incorporated in 1939, the first airline authorized by the federal Civil Aeronautics Board (CAB) to fly as a "local service" air carrier in the United States. It changed its name to Pioneer Air Lines in 1946 and served destinations in New Mexico and Texas.  Pioneer and was acquired by and merged into Continental Airlines in 1955.

An unrelated commuter airline using the name Pioneer Airlines operated in Colorado, Idaho, Montana, Nebraska, New Mexico, North Dakota, South Dakota and Wyoming during the late 1970s through 1980s with Beechcraft 99 and Fairchild Swearingen Metroliner turboprop aircraft. Besides operating as an independent air carrier, this second version of Pioneer also provided feeder connecting flight services on behalf of Continental Airlines as a  Continental Commuter air carrier at the Denver airport (DEN) via a code sharing agreement with Continental from 1983 through 1986.

Background
Founded by Major William F. Long (who owned the Dallas Aviation School and Air College), Essair began a temporary service between Houston and Amarillo, via Austin, San Angelo, Abilene, and Lubbock. On July 11, 1944, the Civil Aeronautics Board agreed that an experiment in subsidized short-haul and local scheduled air service should be conducted. The experiment involved the establishment of a new airline category, known as "feeder" or "local service" air carriers. On August 1, 1945, Essair became the first airline to fly under the new classification, with a temporary certificate. and operated Lockheed Model 10 Electra twin prop aircraft on its routes within Texas.

Pioneer Air Lines
The airline's name became Pioneer Air Lines in 1946. The Electras were replaced by Douglas DC-3s with 23 of the type  being used between 1946 and 1953. New routes to several cities in New Mexico were added in 1948. From June 1952, nine Martin 2-0-2 unpressurised airliners were operated by Pioneer after they were purchased from Northwest Airlines. Davies (and Killion) says the federal CAB forced Pioneer to revert to the DC-3s in 1953 however, per the February 1955 Official Airline Guide (OAG), the carrier reintroduced the 36-seat Martin 202's back on some flights. The 202's were known as "Pioneer Pacemaster" aircraft.

In April 1949 Pioneer scheduled flights to 24 airports in New Mexico and Texas from Albuquerque and El Paso in the west to Dallas and Houston in the east. In February 1955 it flew to 21 airports; later that year it was acquired by and merged into Continental Airlines.

Destinations in 1953

The November 1, 1953 Pioneer Air Lines system timetable listed the following 22 destinations:

 Abilene, TX
 Albuquerque, NM
 Amarillo, TX
 Austin, TX
 Big Spring, TX
 Breckenridge, TX
 Bryan/College Station, TX
 Clovis, NM
 Dallas, TX - Dallas Love Field
 Fort Worth, TX - Amon Carter Field - subsequently renamed Greater Southwest International Airport which was then shut down and no longer exists
 Houston, TX - Houston Hobby Airport - headquarters for the airline
 Lubbock, TX
 Midland/Odessa, TX
 Mineral Wells, TX
 Plainview, TX
 San Angelo, TX
 Santa Fe, NM
 Snyder, TX
 Sweetwater, TX
 Temple, TX
 Tucumcari, NM
 Waco, TX

Pioneer also previously served El Paso, TX, Las Cruces, NM, Las Vegas, NM, and Roswell, NM, from 1948 to 1951.

Following its acquisition of Pioneer, the April 1, 1955, Continental Airlines timetable contained this message:  "Now...ONE GREAT AIRLINE to serve you better!  Pioneer Air Lines, serving 22 cities over 2000 route miles in Texas and New Mexico, officially becomes part of the greater Continental Air Lines system and opens a new era in air transportation for the Southwest!"  However, by late 1963 Continental had ceased serving a number of the destinations previously served by Pioneer as the routes were transferred to Trans-Texas Airways.

Fleet

 Douglas DC-3
 Lockheed Model 10 Electra (initially operated by Essair)
 Martin 2-0-2
 Consolidated Fleetster 20A

See also
 Harding Lawrence
 List of defunct airlines of the United States

Bibliography

References

External links

Essair Lines timetable images, 1945 and 1946
President Johnson Letter regarding ""Order Denying Petition for Rehearing, Reargument and Reconsideration" 
Ed Coates' Civil Aircraft Photograph Collection

Defunct airlines of the United States
Companies based in Houston
Airlines established in 1939
Airlines disestablished in 1955
Defunct companies based in Texas
1939 establishments in Texas
1955 disestablishments in Texas
1955 mergers and acquisitions